Richard Wyke Fowler (13 February 1890 – 19 July 1937) was an Australian rules footballer who played with Melbourne in the Victorian Football League (VFL).

References

External links 

 

1890 births
1937 deaths
VFL/AFL players born outside Australia
Australian rules footballers from Victoria (Australia)
Melbourne Football Club players
People educated at Caulfield Grammar School